= Bražciems =

Neighbourhood of Jūrmala, Latvia

Coordinates: 56°58′N 23°52′E

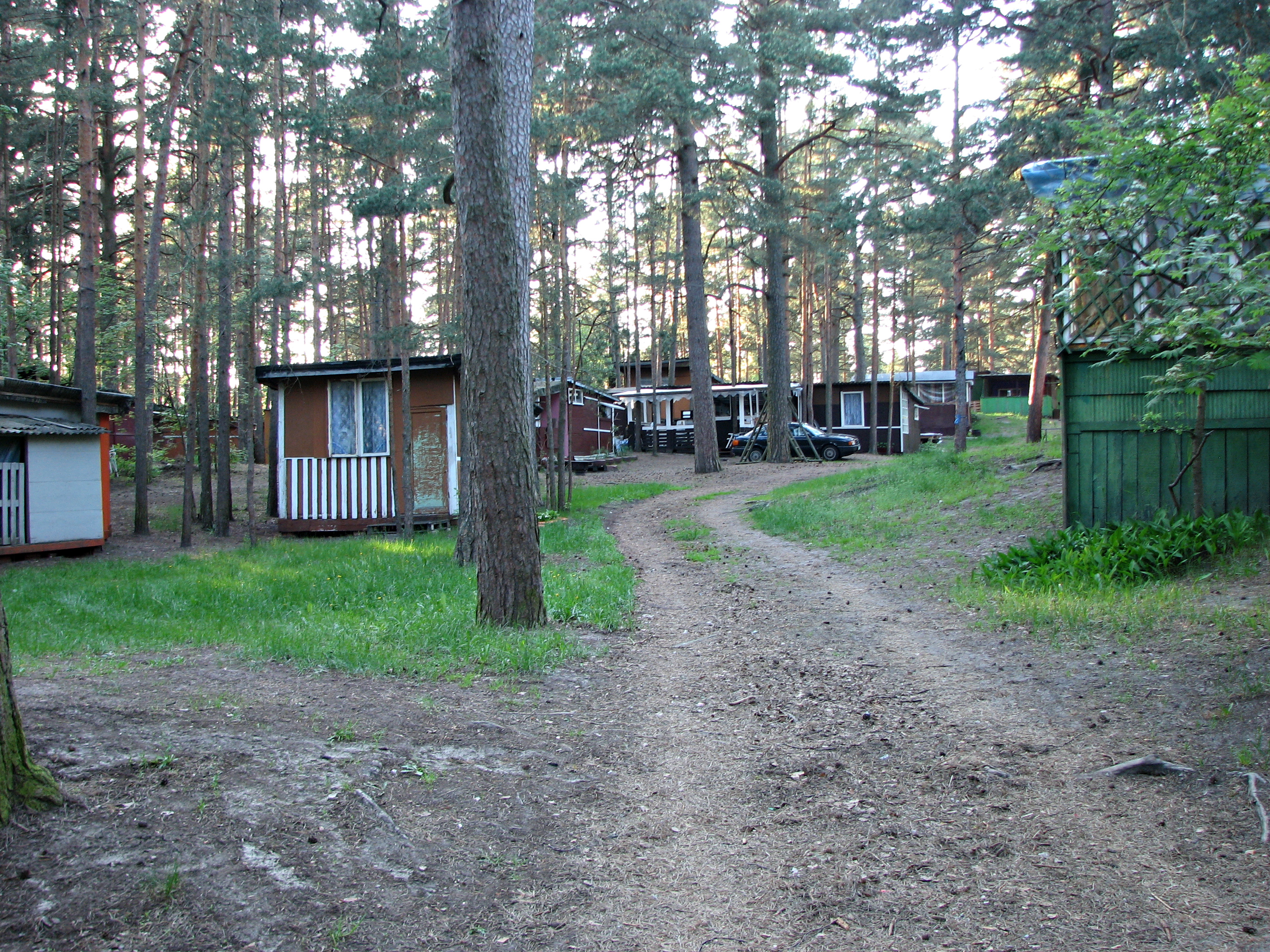
- Summer cottages near Bražciems.

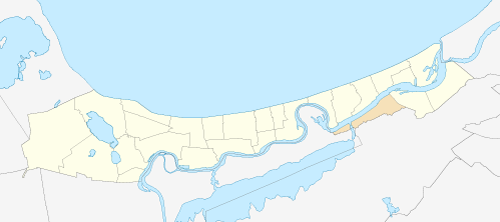
- Location in Jūrmala
- Country: Latvia
- City: Jūrmala

Area
  - Total: 3.9 km^{2} (1.5 sq mi)
- Elevation: 3 m (9.8 ft)

Population (2008)
  - Total: 179
  - Density: 45.9/km^{2} (119/sq mi)

Bražciems (also Bražuciems, Bražas) is a residential area and neighbourhood of the city Jūrmala, Latvia.
